Communicative may refer to:

 Communicative action, cooperative action undertaken by individuals based upon mutual deliberation and argumentation
 Communicative assent, form of deliberative decision-making
 Communicative competence, encompassing a language user's grammatical and social knowledge
 Communicative disorders assistant (CDA), an allied health profession
 Communicative dynamism, a linguistics notion
 Communicative ecology, conceptual model used within media and communications research
 Communicative language teaching, or the communicative approach, approach to language teaching emphasizing interaction as both the means and the goal of study
 Communicative planning, an approach to urban planning
 Communicative rationality, theory (or a set of them) describing human rationality as a necessary outcome of successful communication